Burnet is a city in and the county seat of Burnet County, Texas, United States.  Its population was 6,436 at the 2020 census.

Both the city and the county were named for David Gouverneur Burnet, the first (provisional) president of the Republic of Texas. He also served as vice president during the administration of Mirabeau B. Lamar.

Geography

Burnet is located one mile west of the divide between the Brazos and Colorado River watersheds near the center of Burnet County.

History
In December 1847, a company of the Texas Ranger Division commanded by Henry E. McCulloch established a station at the site of present-day Burnet for the protection of frontier settlers from Indian raids. In March 1849, the station was chosen as a federal fort and named Fort Croghan.

A town was founded next to Fort Croghan in 1852, when Burnet County was established. The town was originally named Hamilton after John Hamilton, who owned a league and labor of land nearby. In August 1852, a post office was established in Hamilton and named Burnet Courthouse. In 1857, 35 residents of the town petitioned the state legislature to change the name of the town to Burnet since another town in Texas was named Hamilton; the name was changed in 1858. Major growth occurred with the arrival of the Austin and Northwestern Railroad in April 1882, when Burnet became the railhead for the area to the west. After the railroad was extended to Llano in 1892, Burnet declined as a supply point and became a farming and livestock center. The City of Burnet was incorporated in 1933.

The Burnet Bulletin newspaper has served the community since 1873 and is the official paper of record for the city and Burnet County.

Demographics

2020 census

As of the 2020 United States census, 6,436 people, 2,142 households, and 1,363 families resided in the city. The population density was 693.1 people per square mile (267.7/km2). The 1,813 housing units had an average density of 265.4/sq mi (102.5/km2).  Of the 1,661 households, 31.7% had children under 18 living with them, 49.3% were married couples living together, 14.1% had a female householder with no husband present, and 32.9% were not families. About 28.8% of all households were made up of individuals, and 16.4% had someone living alone who was 65 or older. The average household size was 2.46, and the average family size was 3.00.

In the city, the age distribution of the population was 23.9% under 18, 9.5% from 18 to 24, 29.9% from 25 to 44, 17.8% from 45 to 64, and 18.8% who were 65 or older. The median age was 37 years.

The median income for a household in the city was $27,093, and for a family was $37,604. Males had a median income of $25,663 versus $17,163 for females. The per capita income for the city was $13,749. About 11.8% of families and 14.7% of the population were below the poverty line, including 18.1% of those under 18 and 15.2% of those 65 or over.

Economy
Major employers in Burnet include the Burnet Consolidated Independent School District (285 employees), Entegris [manufacturer of materials for semiconductor and flat panel industry] (180), Burnet County government (140), Seton Highland Lakes Hospital (120), Texas Dept. of Criminal Justice substance abuse facility (120), City of Burnet government (120), H.E.B. grocery store (100), Sure Cast (92), Hoover Companies (90), Southwestern Graphite Co. (45), Whataburger (40), Bilbrough Marble Co. (25), Lone Star Industries (25), and Dash Covers, Inc. (25).

Education
Burnet is served by Burnet Consolidated Independent School District and home to the Burnet High School Bulldogs.

Located outside of Burnet is a summer camp called Camp Longhorn that has three branches (Inks Lake, Indian Springs, and C3).

Transportation
Burnet is served by two primary highways:
  U.S. Highway 281 – a north–south route connecting Burnet with the towns of Lampasas (22 mi north) and Marble Falls (13 mi south). San Antonio is 100 miles south.
  State Highway 29 – an east–west route connecting Burnet with Llano (30 mi west) and Georgetown (36 mi east). State Highway 29 intersects with Interstate 35 in Georgetown.

Rail service is provided by the Hill Country Flyer steam train from Cedar Park. The Hill Country Flyer is operated every Saturday in January and February, most Saturdays and Sundays March–May, and most Saturdays in October and November.

Burnet Municipal Airport, also known as Kate Craddock Field (ICAO Code KBMQ), is a general-aviation airport located about a mile south of State Highway 29 on U.S. Highway 281. The airport is home to the Highland Lakes Squadron of the Commemorative Air Force.

Tourist attractions

Attractions in the Burnet area include the Highland Lakes, Longhorn Cavern, Inks Lake State Park, the Historic Burnet Square, the Highland Lakes Air Museum, Hill Country Motorheads Vintage Motorcycle Museum Fort Croghan Museum and Grounds, the Vanishing Texas River Cruise, Hamilton Creek Park, Spider Mountain Bike Park, Galloway Hammond Recreation Center, Delaware Springs Golf Course, and the Austin Steam Train Association's Hill Country Flyer.

The Historic Square features buildings from as early as the 1880s, which offer a variety of unique shops and eateries.

Notable people

 Doak Field, a professional American football player: As a linebacker at Baylor University, Field was selected in the 1981 draft by the Philadelphia Eagles of the National Football League.  He appeared in seven games in the 1981 season for the St. Louis Cardinals of the NFL.
 Stephen McGee, football player for Texas A&M University and the Dallas Cowboys
 Andrew Moses, a native of Burnet, was a career officer in the United States Army and attained the rank of major general.
 Jordan Shipley, wide receiver of The University of Texas at Austin and the Cincinnati Bengals
 Logan Vandeveer was a Texas soldier, ranger, cattleman, and civic leader. Vandeveer was a leader in presenting the petition to the legislature in 1852 to establish Burnet County and was instrumental in having the town of Burnet named the county seat.

Gallery

Climate
The climate in this area is characterized by hot, humid summers and generally mild to cool winters.  According to the Köppen climate classification, Burnet has a humid subtropical climate, Cfa on climate maps. 

References

External links

 
 City of Burnet official website
 Burnet Chamber of Commerce
 Official Burnet Visitor's Guide
 Burnet Bulletin newspaper

Cities in Texas
Cities in Burnet County, Texas
County seats in Texas
Populated places established in 1852
1852 establishments in Texas